Alok Vaid-Menon (born July 1, 1991) is an American writer, performance artist, and media personality who performs under the moniker ALOK. Alok is gender non-conforming and transfeminine, and uses the singular they third person pronouns.

As a mixed-media artist, Alok uses poetry, comedy, performance, lecture, sound-art, fashion design, self-portraiture, and social media to explore themes of gender, race, trauma, belonging, and the human condition. Their artistry responds to violence against trans and gender non-conforming people, calling for freedom from constraining gender norms. They advocate for bodily diversity, gender neutrality, and self-determination. Alok has presented creative work in over 40 countries.

Early life and education 
Vaid-Menon grew up in College Station, Texas as the child of Malayali and Punjabi immigrant parents from Malaysia and India, who went to work as a professor and health care executive. Growing up, Alok was bullied for their race and gender expression. They felt that they were unable to come out on their own terms because as a visibly gender non-conforming person, they did not know they were different until they were punished for it and told who they were. They developed their art practice at a young age in response to this harassment. "Making art gave me the permission to live. I needed somewhere to put the pain." They began to use poetry and style to interrupt other peoples’ assumptions, challenge shame, and declare themself on their own terms. Because they were not able to express themself visually for fear of safety, they began to share their art online and received supportive responses.

In 2019 Alok returned to College Station to host a Pride celebration with the local LGBTQ community in honor of the 50th anniversary of Stonewall.

After leaving Texas, Alok attended Stanford University where they graduated with a BA in feminist, gender, and sexuality studies and comparative studies in race and ethnicity, as well as a masters in sociology in 2013.

Career

Performance 
Alok's performance style is known for its stream of consciousness, soundscapes, political comedy, and emotional range. They remark that their style, like their identity, is in constant flux and refuses easy categorization and believe that performance is one of the only spaces where people can actually be real anymore. In this way, for Alok, performance is about world-making where the audience can relate to one another with "a commitment to vulnerability, play, interdependence, and magic". For Alok, the power of performance is precisely that it is ephemeral and can never be done again the same way. They also use performance as a mode of pedagogy to teach theories and histories that have been submerged.

There are several themes that reoccur in Alok's work. They unpack the dynamics of transmisogyny, reflect on the continued attack on trans and gender non-conforming people, and shift the representation of TGNC people. In 2017, Alok released their inaugural book of poetry, Femme in Public, a meditation on harassment against transfeminine people. They toured a show associated with the book across the world, partnering with local trans artists and organizations, to advocate for trans justice. In Vice they write, "the majority of people still believe that trans is what we look like, and not who we are. We are reduced to the spectacle of our appearance." Alok advocates for transfeminine people to be regarded in their full personhood: "There is a long history of trans-femme bodies being reduced to metaphor, to symbol…and seen as stand-ins for ideas, fantasies, and nightmares." They draw attention to the fact that even though gender non-conforming people are the most visible in public, they remain the most neglected by the mainstream LGBT movement.

Alok is committed to challenging what they call "the international crisis of loneliness" by creating public spaces for processing pain and establishing meaningful connection.  This work includes re-imagining and deploying technology as a conduit for intimacy. In 2019, Alok completed an artist-in-residence program at The Invisible Dog Art Center, where they performed a piece entitled "Strangers are Potential Friends" and hosted a "Valentine's Cry-In" to create a space for public grief and explore alternative forms of intimacy and interdependence. Alok facilitates "Feelings Workshops" across the world to develop transformative ways of interacting with ourselves, one another, and as a way of promoting emotional justice and wellness.

They challenge Western rationalism and an emphasis on reductive categories and instead insist on the complexity and enormity of everyone and everything. They want to create work and ways of relating to each other that are less about being understood, and more about being felt. They believe that art is one of the places we can come closest to approximating truth. In an interview with the Chicago Tribune they write, "The problem with a category is that you reduce something as celestial as a human being into a word. Words only approximate truth, and art is where we go when we actually want truth. In “Trans Self-Imaging Praxis, Decolonizing Photography, and the Work of Alok Vaid-Menon,” Ace Lehner explains that there is so much to the non-binary world of art then what meets the eyes. “As an identity and an analytic, trans offers a compelling challenge to photographic discourse” (page.1). The artist Alok Vaid-Menon has featured many trans people in their artwork; Vaid-Menon explains that it can be hard to exemplify gender through a piece of art, however, they have done the most to overcome this obstacle and it can be seen through their work. However, Vaid-Menon does not only portray their work through photography, but they also write, design clothing a clothing line, and create videos explaining and encouraging others. Vaid-Menon has also been featured in: ““Beauty Always Recognizes Itself”: A Roundtable on Sins Invalid” by Patricia Berne, Jamal T. Lewis et al. In this journal article, each artist reflects on what beauty, injustice, discrimination, and how it has impacted their artwork. Vaid-Menon mentions that, “As a gender non-conforming, transfeminine person, I am often told that I am ugly…” (page. 242). They have since then chosen to challenge their artwork to display these issues, however, to step out and do this there needs to be support, even in the LGBTQ+ community.

Vaid-Menon asserts that beauty can be a cruel arrangement of rules that must be followed. In “Fashion's Genderless Future”, Vaid-Menon examines what needs to be done to normalize respect for non-binary and LGBTQ+ fashion and “degender the fashion community” (Menon, M.10:00 min), making gender neutrality in fashion about creating possibility and not all about gender. Valid-Menon has also written a book of reasons why people should view gender as more than the traditional black and white. In “Beyond the Gender Binary”, they state, “The gender binary is cultural belief that there are only two distinct and opposite genders: man and woman. This belief is upheld by a system of power that exists to create conflict and division, not to celebrate creativity and diversity” (page.1). Vaid-Menon focuses and points out the many flaws that are consistently in the thoughts of people around the world. Their main goal is to transform and challenge a person to see beyond man and female genders.

Fashion design 

Alok has designed three gender-neutral fashion collections, which are known for their joyful color and celebration of skirts and dresses as gender neutral. Fashion design became a "materialization of the life that [they were] living," a way to encapsulate what they were writing and thinking. Their designs were at first inspired by imagining what they would wear if they didn't have to fear violence. In their latest work, they are using fashion to challenge what kind of aesthetics are seen as natural and what are seen as artificial.

In a 2019 interview with Business of Fashion, Vaid-Menon advocated for the complete degendering of fashion and beauty industries.

Modeling 
Alok has walked for several fashion brands for New York Fashion Week including Opening Ceremony, Studio 189, and Chromat. They have modeled for several brands including Opening Ceremony, Harry's, and Polaroid Eyewear. They have appeared in fashion magazines and editorials including Vogue, Vogue Italia, Bust magazine, Wussy Magazine, and Paper magazine.

Personal life 
Alok's aunt was Urvashi Vaid, an LGBT rights activist, lawyer, and writer.

Publications 

 Femme in Public (2017)
 "Entertainment Value" in Unwatchable (Rutgers University Press, 2019)
 Beyond The Gender Binary (2020)
Your Wound/My Garden. (2021)

Selected live performances 
2014: Queer New York International Arts Festival
2015: Lincoln Center La Casita Festival
2015, 2016: Public Theater Under the Radar Festival Festival
2017: Centrale Fies Drodesera Festival
2017: Naked Heart Festival Toronto
2018: Keynote Performance - Transgender Europe Conference, Antwerp
2018: Keynote Performance - Gender Unbound Festival Austin
2019: Spoken Fest Mumbai
2019: Keynote Performance—OUTShine EGALE Conference Fredericton, New Brunswick

TV and film appearances 

 Refinery 29 "Love Me" (2016)
 "The Trans List" (HBO, 2016)
 "Random Acts of Flyness" (HBO, 2018)
 Gender Diversity & Identity In Queertopia (Backlight National Dutch Documentary, 2019)
 "What I Wish You Knew: Mental Health Roundtable" (Netflix, 2020)
A Little Late with Lilly Singh (NBC, Season 2, Episode 16, 2021)
Absolute Dominion (Film, Post-production)

Awards and recognition 

 Live Works Performance Act Award (2017)
 Vogue: 9 Trans + Gender Non-Conforming Writers You Should Know (2018)
LogoTV Pride 30 (2018)
NBC Pride 50 alongside James Baldwin and Audre Lorde (2019)
OUT Magazine 100 (2019)

References

External links 

 Alok Vaid-Menon's website

Living people
American writers of Indian descent
American performance artists
21st-century American poets
People from College Station, Texas
American LGBT rights activists
Queer feminists
Transfeminists
Queer writers
Stanford University alumni
LGBT people from Texas
Poets from Texas
Performance art in New York City
1991 births
Non-binary artists
American LGBT people of Asian descent
Non-binary activists
21st-century American LGBT people
American non-binary writers
American people of Malayali descent
American people of Punjabi descent